William Thompson Scott (born July 20, 1947) is an American jurist who is a former Associate Justice of the Kentucky Supreme Court. He was elected in November 2004 to represent the 7th Supreme Court District, which consists of 22 counties in Eastern Kentucky.

Effective July 1, 2006, Justice Scott replaced Justice Martin E. Johnstone (who retired June 30, 2006) as Deputy Chief Justice of the Supreme Court. Then-Chief Justice Joseph Lambert conducted the formal swearing-in ceremony for Deputy Chief Justice Scott on July 17, 2006. Scott served as Deputy Chief Justice from 2006 to 2010.

A Vietnam veteran, he is a recipient of the Bronze Star Medal. He suspended his studies after a year at Eastern Kentucky University to volunteer in 1966, serving as a first lieutenant. After serving, he received a bachelor's degree from Pikeville College and a J.D. degree from the University of Miami in Florida.

Scott previously served as a trial attorney from 1975 to 1980, as an assistant commonwealth's attorney for Pike County from 1981 to 1982 and as a Kentucky Circuit Court judge from 1984 to 1988.

Scott was the Republican Party nominee for Kentucky's 7th congressional district in 1988 and 1990, losing to Democratic incumbent Carl C. Perkins on both occasions. He was also the Republican nominee for Attorney General of Kentucky in 1995, losing to Democrat Ben Chandler.

In November 2014, Scott revealed that he was considering running for Governor of Kentucky in the 2015 election. On December 29, 2014, he announced that he would resign from the bench effective January 2, 2015. On January 6, he announced his candidacy for Governor. On January 13, 2015, Scott kicked off his Republican campaign for governor Tuesday by announcing that former Menifee County Sheriff Rodney Coffey would be his running mate.
 
Scott urged Kentuckians to contact Senator Rand Paul and Senate Majority Leader Mitch McConnell and ask them to help push the Obama Administration to move ahead faster with oil and gas drilling in the Alaskan Arctic.

After resigning from the Kentucky Supreme Court, David Allen Barber was appointed in Scott's place until Samuel T. Wright III was elected and replaced him.

References

1947 births
Eastern Kentucky University alumni
Justices of the Kentucky Supreme Court
Living people
People from Pike County, Kentucky
University of Miami School of Law alumni
University of Pikeville alumni